

 Bales Beach Aquatic Reserve was a marine protected area in the Australian state of South Australia located in waters off the south coast of Kangaroo Island immediately adjoining and including the intertidal zone within the locality of Seal Bay whose full extent is occupied by the Seal Bay Conservation Park.

It was declared after 1971 for the purpose of ‘the protection of a major breeding colony of the Australian sea lion’. The collection or the removal of any marine organism was prohibited within the reserve. While it was managed in conjunction with the Seal Bay Aquatic Reserve, it was gazetted as a separate aquatic reserve. On 20 October 2016, it was abolished.

Since 2012, it was located within the boundaries of a “habitat protection zone” within the Southern Kangaroo Island Marine Park.

The aquatic reserve was classified as an IUCN Category II protected area.

See also
Protected areas of South Australia

References

External links
Entry for Bales Beach Aquatic Reserve on the Protected Planet website

Aquatic reserves of South Australia
Protected areas established in 1971  
1971 establishments in Australia
Protected areas disestablished in 2016
2016 disestablishments in Australia
Protected areas of Kangaroo Island